David C. Owen (born August 10, 1938) is an American former politician. He was the 38th Lieutenant Governor of Kansas from 1973 to 1975. He is an alumnus of Ottawa University. He is married to former Kansas Secretary of Commerce Laura Owen.

References

1938 births
Living people
Kansas Republicans
Lieutenant Governors of Kansas
People from Bradley County, Arkansas
Ottawa University alumni